The 2011 Kawasaki Frontale season was Kawasaki Frontale's seventh consecutive season in J. League Division 1 and 10th season overall in the Japanese top flight. It also includes the 2011 J. League Cup, and the 2011 Emperor's Cup.

Players

Competitions

J. League

League table

Results summary

Results by round

J. League Cup

Emperor's Cup

References

Kawasaki Frontale
Kawasaki Frontale seasons